Botas or BOTAS may refer to:

Places
 Botas River, a river in Brazil

People
 Juan Rodríguez Botas, impressionist painter

Other uses
 BOTAŞ, a crude oil and natural gas pipelines and trading company in Turkey
 Botas (company), Czech shoe and sportswear manufacturer
 Botaş SK, a sports club known for its women's basketball team

See also
 Bottas
 BOTA (disambiguation)